The 1949 East Tennessee State Buccaneers football team was an American football team that represented East Tennessee State College (ETSC)—now known as East Tennessee State University—as a member of the Smoky Mountain Conference during the 1949 college football season. Led by third-year head coach Loyd Roberts, the Buccaneers compiled an ovferall record of 5–4, with a mark of 3–1 in conference play, placing second among Smoky Mountains teams. The Buccaneers had become a force to reckoned with during the postwar years with the emergence of quarterback Jack Vest in the late 1940s. Bob Tranburger served his second term as co-captain of the team and was the first Buccaneer to be named to an All-American (Paul B. Williams) team.

Schedule

References

East Tennessee State
East Tennessee State Buccaneers football seasons
East Tennessee State Buccaneers football